Scott Wilson may refer to:

People

Sportspeople
 Scott Wilson (1980s rugby league), former rugby league footballer
 Scott Wilson (bodybuilder) (1950–2018), American bodybuilder
 Scott Wilson (footballer, born 1977), Scottish footballer (Rangers, Dunfermline, North Queensland Fury)
 Scott Wilson (footballer, born 1982), Scottish footballer (Airdrie, Clyde, Stranraer)
 Scott Wilson (footballer, born 1993), English footballer (Macclesfield)
 Scott Wilson (footballer, born 2000), English footballer (Burnley, Barrow)
 Scott Wilson (ice hockey) (born 1992), Canadian ice hockey player
 Scott Wilson (rugby league, born 1970), Australian former professional rugby league footballer

Other people
 Scott Wilson (academic) (born 1962), scholar in media and cultural theory
 Scott Wilson (actor) (1942–2018), American actor
 Scott Wilson (composer) (born 1969), Canadian composer
 Scott Wilson (judge) (1870–1942), judge on the United States Court of Appeals for the First Circuit
 Scott Wilson (musician) (born 1972), American musician and producer
 Scott Barchard Wilson (1865–1923), ornithologist and bird collector

Enterprises
 Scott Wilson Group, a UK-based civil engineering consultancy